Battipaglia is a railway station in Battipaglia, Italy. The station is located on the Salerno–Reggio Calabria railway and Battipaglia–Metaponto railway. The train services are operated by Trenitalia.

Train services
The station is served by the following service(s):

Intercity services Rome - Naples - Salerno - Lamezia Terme - Reggio di Calabria
Intercity services Rome - Naples - Salerno - Taranto
Regional services (Treno regionale) Naples - Salerno - Agropoli - Sapri - Cosenza
Regional services (Treno regionale) Naples - Salerno - Potenza - Metaponto - Taranto

References

This article is based upon a translation of the Italian language version as at June 2014.

External links

Railway stations in Campania
Railway station
Buildings and structures in the Province of Salerno
Railway stations opened in 1863